The Hotan Silk Factory is a silk factory in Hotan, Xinjiang, China. It is located to the northeast of the town of Hotan and manufactures many colorful silks which are sold in market. The factory offers tours in Chinese of the silk-making process, from the boiling of the cocoons to the printing of the silk.

References

Hotan
Buildings and structures in Xinjiang